Nasir Kandi or Nasirkandi may refer to:
 Nasir Kandi, Arshaq, Ardabil Province
 Nasir Kandi, Moradlu, Ardabil Province
 Nasir Kandi, Charuymaq, East Azerbaijan Province
 Nasir Kandi, Maragheh, East Azerbaijan Province
 Nasir Kandi, West Azerbaijan